Yoon Jeong-hee (July 30, 1944 – January 19, 2023) was a South Korean actress, who debuted in 1967 in Theatre of Youth. She appeared in about 330 films, and her better known works are New Place (1979), Woman in Crisis (1987) and Manmubang (1994). Her last performance was in 2010, in director Lee Chang-dong's film Poetry, for which she won 7 best actress awards including Asia Pacific Screen Award for Best Actress at 4th Asia Pacific Screen Awards, the Grand Bell Award at 47th Grand Bell Awards, and Los Angeles Film Critics Association Award at 2011 Los Angeles Film Critics Association Awards.

Career
Yoon was born in Busan, South Korea and debuted as an actress in 1967 by starring in Cheongchun Geukjang directed by Gang Dae-jin after being chosen in a recruit held by Hapdong Film. Yoon was commonly referred to as one of the "Troika" (three) of the 1960s, along with her rival actresses, Moon Hee and Nam Jeong-im.

She came out of retirement in 2010 to star in Lee Chang-dong's film, Poetry, which won her the Los Angeles Film Critics Association Award for Best Actress and the Asia Pacific Screen Award for Best Performance by an Actress.

Personal life and death
Yoon married noted pianist Kun-Woo Paik in 1974. The couple had a daughter who is a violinist. Yoon resided in Paris, France with her family since her retirement in the mid-90s, until making her comeback in Lee Chang-dong's Poetry.

Yoon, who suffered from Alzheimer's disease, died on January 19, 2023, in Paris. She was 78.

Filmography 
*Note; the whole list is referenced.

Awards 
 1967, the 6th Grand Bell Awards : New Actress (청춘극장)
 1967, the 5th Blue Dragon Film Awards : Favorite Actress
 1968, the 4th Baeksang Arts Awards : Film part, New Actress (안개)
 1969, the 6th Blue Dragon Film Awards : Favorite Actress
 1970, the 6th Baeksang Arts Awards : Film part, Favorite Actress selected by readers
 1970, the 6th Baeksang Arts Awards : Film part, Best Acting Award (독짓는 늙은이)
 1970, the 7th Blue Dragon Film Awards : Favorite Actress
 1971, the 10th Grand Bell Awards : Best Actress (분례기)
 1971, the 7th Baeksang Arts Awards : Film part, Best Acting Award (해변의 정사)
 1971, the 7th Baeksang Arts Awards : Film part, Favorite Actress selected by readers
 1971, the 8th Blue Dragon Film Awards : Favorite Actress
 1972, the 8th Baeksang Arts Awards : Film part, Favorite Actress selected by readers
 1972, the 9th Blue Dragon Film Awards : Best Actress (석화촌)
 1972, the 9th Blue Dragon Film Awards : Favorite Actress
 1973, the 9th Baeksang Arts Awards : Film part, Best Acting Award (석화촌)
 1973, the 9th Baeksang Arts Awards : Film part, Favorite Actress selected by readers
 1973, the 10th Blue Dragon Film Awards : Best Actress (효녀심청)
 1973, the 10th Blue Dragon Film Awards : Favorite Actress
 1974, the 10th Baeksang Arts Awards : Film part, Favorite Actress selected by readers
 1975, the 11th Baeksang Arts Awards : Film part, Favorite Actress selected by readers
 1992, the 12th Korean Association of Film Critics Awards : Best Acting Award(여자) (눈꽃)
 1994, the 32nd Grand Bell Awards : Best Actress (만무방)
 2010, the 47th Grand Bell Awards : Best Actress (Poetry)
 2010, the 31st Blue Dragon Film Awards : Best Actress (Poetry)
 2010, the 4th Asia Pacific Screen Awards: Best Performance by an Actress (Poetry)
 2010, the 2010 Women in Film Korea Festival: Woman in Film of the Year (Poetry)
 2011, the 13th Cinemanila International Film Festival : Best Actress (Poetry)
 2011, the 37th Los Angeles Film Critics Association : Best Actress (Poetry)
 2018, the 38th Korean Association of Film Critics Awards: Lifetime Award

References

External links 
 
 
 

1944 births
2023 deaths 
South Korean film actresses
People from Gwangju
Deaths from Alzheimer's disease 
Deaths from dementia in France
Asia Pacific Screen Award winners
Best Actress Paeksang Arts Award (film) winners
Officiers of the Ordre des Arts et des Lettres
20th-century South Korean actresses
21st-century South Korean actresses
Korea University alumni
University of Paris alumni
South Korean expatriates in France
Actresses from Busan